The Zigan (Yegän), is a river in Bashkortostan, Russia, a right tributary of the Belaya. The Kiyauk and the Sikasya are tributaries of the Zigan.

References

Rivers of Bashkortostan